The NAC Fieldmaster was a British agricultural aircraft of the 1980s. A turboprop powered single-engined monoplane, it was built in small numbers and used both as a cropsprayer and a firefighting aircraft.

Development and design
NDN Aircraft was set up in 1976 by Desmond Norman to build the Firecracker trainer. Norman had been a founder of the Britten-Norman company, the manufacturers of the Islander. NDN Aircraft designed a new agricultural aircraft, the NDN-6 Fieldmaster. This was a large single-engined low-winged monoplane with a fixed tricycle undercarriage, powered by a Pratt & Whitney Canada PT6 turboprop engine, the first western-built agricultural aircraft to be designed for turboprop power. Novel features included an integral hopper made of Titanium to carry its chemical payload, which was dispersed via spray nozzles built into the flaps under the aircraft's wings.

The first prototype flew on 17 December 1981 at NDN's airfield at Sandown, Isle of Wight. TNDN moved the premises to Cardiff, Wales in 1985, renaming itself the Norman Aeroplane Company (NAC).  Production finally started in 1987. It was intended that parts would be produced by UTVA in Pančevo, Yugoslavia (now in Serbia) to be assembled in Cardiff.

NAC went into receivership in 1988, after the production of six Fieldmasters, including the prototype. Brooklands Aerospace attempted to continue production, rebuilding one of the Fieldmasters with a more powerful engine as a specialised firefighting aircraft as the Firemaster 65, but these attempts were stopped by the outbreak of civil war in Yugoslavia.

A final attempt at production was made by the Turkish Aeronautical Association (Türk Hava Kurumu – THK) who started licensed production in 1997. This ended in 1999 after completion of two complete aircraft and a further two airframes lacking engines.

Variants
NDN-6 FieldmasterThe initial designation for the prototype; one built.
NAC Fieldmaster Designation of production aircraft after the formation of the Norman Aeroplane Company (NAC); five built.
Brooklands Aerospace Firemaster 65A rebuilt Fieldmaster with more powerful engine and firefighting equipment; one conversion.
THK-TAYSU Production in Turkey by Türk Hava Kurumu (THK); four built

Specifications (NAC 6)

See also

References

Further reading

External links

1980s British agricultural aircraft
Fieldmaster
Single-engined tractor aircraft
Single-engined turboprop aircraft
Low-wing aircraft
Aircraft first flown in 1981
Fieldmaster